Johan Brunström and Ken Skupski were the defending champions but decided not to participate together.
Brunström played alongside Raven Klaasen, while Skupski partnered up with Jamie Delgado.
Tomasz Bednarek and Jerzy Janowicz won the final 7–5, 4–6, [10–2] against Michaël Llodra and Édouard Roger-Vasselin.

Seeds

  Michaël Llodra /  Édouard Roger-Vasselin (final)
  Paul Hanley /  Christopher Kas (first round)
  Jamie Delgado /  Ken Skupski (first round)
  Johan Brunström /  Raven Klaasen (first round)

Draw

Draw

References
 Main Draw

Ethias Trophy - Doubles
2012 Doubles